The Dixie Flagler was a streamlined passenger train operated by the Florida East Coast Railway (FEC) between Chicago, Illinois and Miami, Florida. It began in 1939 as the Henry M. Flagler, a regional service between Miami and Jacksonville, Florida; the FEC renamed it and extended it to Chicago a year later. It was one of the few Chicago to Florida trains that passed through Atlanta. As an overnight streamliner it was part of the every-third-day pool shared by the City of Miami and South Wind. It was renamed Dixieland in 1954 and discontinued altogether in 1957.

History 
The train began as the Henry M. Flagler, a daily streamliner between Jacksonville and Miami, named for industrialist Henry Flagler. This service began on December 3, 1939, using a set of equipment built by the Budd Company. With the introduction of two new overnight all-coach streamliners on cooperating railroads, the Henry M. Flagler equipment was placed in service on a rotating once every three days overnight schedule between Chicago and Miami as the Dixie Flagler beginning December 17, 1940. Together with its counterparts the South Wind and  City of Miami, the trains offered daily service between Chicago and the east coast of Florida. Originally intended as a winter-season-only service, the public response was strong enough that the trains were placed into permanent year-round service by the summer of 1941.

The FEC dropped the Dixie Flagler name in 1954 in favor of Dixieland; it discontinued the service altogether in 1957. However, the Dixie Flyer, operating over the same route, with a night departure from Chicago, endured until 1965, and carried on by the Atlantic Coast Line Railroad and the Seaboard Coast Line Railroad until 1969.

Route 
As a daytime streamliner, the Henry M. Flagler operated entirely over the Florida East Coast Railway, however, this particular train ended in 1940. 

To travel from Chicago to Florida, the Dixie Flagler used six separate railroads. The train left Chicago's Dearborn Station on the Chicago and Eastern Illinois Railroad (C&EI). Between Evansville, Indiana, and Nashville, Tennessee, it used the Louisville and Nashville Railroad (L&N). From Nashville south to Atlanta, Georgia's Union Station, via Chattanooga, TN, it used the Nashville, Chattanooga and St. Louis Railway (NC), a subsidiary of the L&N. From Atlanta southeast to Waycross, Georgia, it travelled over the Atlanta, Birmingham and Coast Railroad (AB&C), a subsidiary of the Atlantic Coast Line Railroad (ACL). At Waycross it joined the ACL itself, and stayed on it until reaching Jacksonville, the northern terminus of the FEC. From there, the train proceeded over the FEC to Miami. At Jacksonville it had sections that split and joined with the ACL's West Coast Champion and went to Sarasota via Orlando and Tampa, and St. Petersburg via Gainesville.

Major stops
Chicago (Dearborn Station)
St. Louis (Union Station) [the Chicago and St. Louis branches converged in Evansville]
Terre Haute (Union Station)
Evansville (L&N station)
Nashville (Union Station)
Chattanooga (Union Station)
Atlanta (Union Station)
Jacksonville (Union Station)
Daytona Beach
West Palm Beach
Fort Lauderdale
Miami (FEC station)

Separate connecting Atlantic Coast Line branches from Jacksonville served Gainesville, Orlando, Tampa, St. Petersburg, Sarasota and Ft. Myers.

Equipment 

The Budd Company delivered the original equipment set for the Henry M. Flagler in November 1939. The consist matched three sets delivered for the new Champion. Each equipment set consisted of a baggage-dormitory-coach, four coaches, a dining car, and a tavern-lounge-observation car.

Originally a coach-only train, the Dixie Flagler later received sleeping cars. In 1950 the train departed Chicago with six sleeping cars, five for Miami and one for Jacksonville. These cars had the following configuration:
 3 compartments, 1 double bedroom, buffet-lounge
 6 sections, 6 double bedrooms
 8 sections, 2 compartments, 1 drawing room
 12 roomettes, 2 single bedrooms, 3 double bedrooms
 6 compartments, 3 double bedrooms
 8 sections, 2 compartments, 1 double bedroom
The train carried a full dining car for the entire trip: a C&EI dining car operated between Chicago and Jacksonville, after which an FEC dining car replaced it. The FEC's tavern-lounge-observation car made the entire trip.

References

External links

 1941 timetable at Streamliner Schedules

Named passenger trains of the United States
Night trains of the United States
Passenger rail transportation in Florida
Passenger rail transportation in Georgia (U.S. state)
Passenger rail transportation in Illinois
Passenger rail transportation in Indiana
Passenger rail transportation in Missouri
Passenger rail transportation in Tennessee
Passenger trains of the Chicago and Eastern Illinois Railroad
Passenger trains of the Louisville and Nashville Railroad
Passenger trains of the Nashville, Chattanooga and St. Louis Railway
Passenger trains of the Atlantic Coast Line Railroad
Passenger trains of the Florida East Coast Railway
Railway services introduced in 1939
Railway services discontinued in 1957